The Let's All Be Free Film Festival (LABFFF) is an annual film festival that explores what it means to be free, via the medium of film. The inaugural festival was held in April 2013 in London, and screened 37 short films across many different genres - all focused on exploring what it means to be free. The festival was founded in 2012 by Palestinian-American film director Tariq Nasir, founder and director of the award-winning production company Unusuality Productions, and is one part of the creative cross-platform Let's All Be Free project.

2013 Festival 
The first ever Let's All Be Free Film Festival was held from 5 April to 7 April 2013 at the Brunei Gallery at the School of Oriental and African Studies (SOAS - part of the University of London) in central London. In total, 37 international short films were screened over the three days, that were focused on the topic of freedom, including several world premieres.

The festival also featured panel discussions and Q&As with guest speakers including BAFTA nominated director Kim Longinotto, Amnesty International, human rights organisation Liberty, award-winning Dutch filmmaker Marijn Poels, The Equality Trust, and UCL Economics Professor Richard Disney - all debating what 'being free' meant within the context of their relative professional and personal experiences. There was also a Q&A session with some of the filmmakers whose work screened at the festival, with directors travelling from Sweden, the US, Israel, Germany, Bulgaria and elsewhere in the UK to take part.

There were three competition categories for the festival, each exploring the theme of 'being free':
  Expressions (a film of any genre under 5 minutes)
  Short Fiction (a 5 to 30 minute fictional film)
  Short Documentary (a 5 to 30 minute documentary film)
Prizes of up to a $1000 were awarded to the winners and runner-up in each category.

2014 Festival 
The second annual Let's All Be Free Film Festival was held from 8 April to April 10, 2014 in central London. A new Student Category was introduced, and the festival again featured short films that explored the theme of freedom, as well as guest speakers, discussions and Q&As.

The Let's All Be Free Film Festival was open for submissions via Withoutabox, the submission deadlines were as follows:
  Earlybird Deadline: 20 September 2013
  Regular Deadline: 18 October 2013
 Late Deadline: 22 November 2013
 Withoutabox Extended Deadline: 9 December 2013

2015 Festival 
The Third annual Let's All Be Free Film Festival took place at the Motel Studios in Hoxton between 16–18 October 2015.

Award Winners 
The BAFTA nominated short film The Voorman Problem, directed by Mark Gill and starring Martin Freeman and Tom Hollander went on to win the Short Fiction category.

References

External links 

Official Festival Website

Film festivals in London